Taco Time Northwest is a fast-food restaurant chain with over 70 locations in western and central Washington state.

History
The first Taco Time opened in Eugene, Oregon in 1961. The following year, Frank Tonkin, Sr., opened the restaurant's first Washington location in White Center. 

In 1979, the Tonkin family's restaurants became independent of the parent company, leading to the establishment of Accord Inc. to franchise restaurants in western Washington. The Taco Time restaurants located in eastern Washington (other than those in Wenatchee & East Wenatchee) and Oregon remained with the original corporation.

Locations
Taco Time Northwest has 79 restaurants located across Western Washington, primarily centered in the Seattle metropolitan area, and two restaurants located in Eastern Washington. From 2012 to 2016, the company also operated a food truck called the Taco Time Traveler, which offered a limited menu at Downtown Seattle stops during the weekday lunch hour and catered community and private events on the weekend.

References

External links
Official website

Restaurants in Washington (state)
Regional restaurant chains in the United States
Fast-food chains of the United States
Fast-food Mexican restaurants
Restaurants established in 1979
1979 establishments in Washington (state)
Restaurants in Eugene, Oregon